The Ely–Peterborough line is a railway line in England, linking East Anglia to the Midlands. It is a part of the Network Rail Strategic Route 5, SRS 05.07 and is classified as a secondary line. It is used by a variety of inter-regional and local passenger services from East Anglia to the West Midlands and North West, as well as freight and infrastructure traffic; it also links with the busy East Coast Main Line at its western end.  Fenland District council (the area's primary local authority) put forward their Rail Development Strategy for the route in 2012, which includes infrastructure upgrades for the intermediate stations, improved frequencies for the services using it (e.g. doubling the Birmingham New Street to Stansted Airport service to half-hourly and the Ipswich to Peterborough service to hourly) and establishing a Community Rail Partnership for the line in 2013–14.

History
The latter two were subsequently jointly vested in the GER and GNR in 1879.

Many of the branches fell victim to the Beeching Axe in the early to mid 1960s, as did Peterborough East and several of the intermediate stations.  The March–Spalding line also closed in 1982 with the rundown of the marshalling yard at Whitemoor, leaving only the original main line in operation.

Service

Passenger services are provided by CrossCountry, East Midlands Railway and Greater Anglia. Services used to run between London and Peterborough but these services were dropped in 2010.

The line is used extensively by freight trains from the Port of Felixstowe to the West Midlands, North West and Scotland, as it forms part of the Felixstowe to  rail freight corridor that is being upgraded by Network Rail to allow more railborne freight from the port to be diverted away from the London area.

Infrastructure
Apart from short stretches at each end, the line is not electrified.

See also
 Railways in Ely

References

Rail transport in Cambridgeshire
Ely, Cambridgeshire
Transport in Peterborough
Railway lines in the East of England
Standard gauge railways in England